The South Africa national cricket team toured New Zealand in February and March 1964 and played a three-match Test series against the New Zealand national cricket team. All three matches were drawn. The South Africans had just played a five-Test series in Australia.

South African team

 Trevor Goddard (captain)
 Peter van der Merwe (vice-captain)
 Eddie Barlow
 Colin Bland
 Peter Carlstein
 Buster Farrer
 Clive Halse
 Denis Lindsay
 Joe Partridge
 David Pithey
 Tony Pithey
 Graeme Pollock
 Peter Pollock
 John Waite 

Kelly Seymour, who had been with the team in Australia, returned to South Africa before the New Zealand leg of the tour to study for his medical exams. Graeme Pollock and Clive Halse were suffering from injuries, and Peter Carlstein returned to South Africa during the First Test when he received news that his wife and three of their four children had been killed in a car crash. For much of the tour only eleven players were available to play.

The manager was Ken Viljoen.

Test series summary

First Test

Second Test

Third Test

References

External links
 South Africa in Australia and New Zealand 1963-64 at CricketArchive

Further reading
 Don Neely & Richard Payne, Men in White: The History of New Zealand International Cricket, 1894–1985, Moa, Auckland, 1986, pp. 330–34
 Peter Pollock, The Thirty Tests, Don Nelson, Cape Town, 1978, pp. 43–47
 R.S. Whitington, Bradman, Benaud and Goddard's Cinderellas, Rigby, 1964, pp. 221–37
 Wisden 1965, pp. 838–42
 Colin Bryden, All-Rounder: The Buster Farrer Story, Aloe Publishing, Kidd's Beach, 2013, pp. 83–86

1964 in South African cricket
1964 in New Zealand cricket
New Zealand cricket seasons from 1945–46 to 1969–70
1963-64
International cricket competitions from 1960–61 to 1970